A Commonwealth Games Association (CGA) is a national sports council of the Commonwealth Sports movement. Each association is responsible for organising, supporting and overseeing their national team for both the Commonwealth Games and the Commonwealth Youth Games. The associations are subject to the rules of, and report to, the Commonwealth Games Federation. As well as promoting sports nationally, an association can also place a bid for the Commonwealth Games for a potential host city. While some nations have a stand-alone association dealing exclusively with the Commonwealth Games (particularly the Home Nations, the Crown Dependencies and most of the British Overseas Territories, all of whom compete at the Olympics as one Great Britain team but compete as separate teams at the Commonwealth Games), in many of the Commonwealth nations, the local National Olympic Committee performs the function of Commonwealth Games Association for that nation. In a few nations, such as Eswatini and Malawi, the local organisation carries both names in its normal title.

Member associations
As stated in the CGF Constitution, the current 72 member associations are grouped into the following regions: Gabon and Togo are members of the Commonwealth but have not formed or maintained any associations with the Commonwealth Games Association.

Africa

Americas

Asia

Caribbean

Europe

Oceania

Former members
The following 10 have been members of the CGA in the past, before their nations withdrew from the Commonwealth or merged with other members.

See also
 Commonwealth Games Federation
 Commonwealth Games
 National Olympic Committee

References

External links
 Official Website

Federation
Games Federation
International sports organizations